Errick "E" Lane McCollum II (born January 22, 1988) is an American professional basketball player for the Turkish team Pınar Karşıyaka of the Basketbol Süper Ligi (BSL). He played college basketball for Goshen. At a height of 1.88 m (6'2"), he plays at both the point guard and shooting guard positions.

High school
McCollum attended GlenOak High School, in Canton, Ohio, from 2002 to 2006, where he played with former NBA and Ohio State Buckeye center Kosta Koufos. In 2006, McCollum was joined on the team's varsity squad by his younger brother, then a freshman, CJ McCollum.

College career
McCollum played college basketball at Goshen College from 2006 to 2010.  He graduated as the school's all-time leading scorer with 2,789 points. He was named an NAIA DII All-American in all 4 years at Goshen College. He was also named a First Team NAIA Division II All-American in his senior season.

Professional career

Israel
McCollum started his pro career in 2010, with the Israeli Basketball Premier League club Elitzur Netanya. He spent the 2011–12 season with the Israel 2nd Division club Hapoel Kfar Saba, for whom he averaged 23.8 points, 7.6 rebounds, and 3.4 assists per game.

Greece
McCollum played with the Greek League club Apollon Patras, during the 2012–13 season. He joined the Greek club Panionios, for the 2013–14 season. During the 2013–14 season, he led both the Greek League and the 2nd tier European competition, the EuroCup, in scoring.

China
In July 2014, McCollum joined the Denver Nuggets' summer league squad, for the 2014 NBA Summer League.

In the summer of 2014, McCollum signed a one-year deal with the Zhejiang Golden Bulls of the Chinese Basketball Association (CBA). On January 30, 2015, he set the new single game scoring record in the Chinese Basketball Association, with 82 points scored in one game. McCollum also added 10 rebounds and 4 assists in the same game, but his team, the Zhejiang Golden Bulls, lost the game to the Guangdong Southern Tigers, by a score of 129-119.

Turkey
On September 5, 2015, McCollum signed a one-year deal to play in Turkey, with the Turkish club Galatasaray, of the European-wide 2nd-tier level EuroCup. In the 2015–16 EuroCup season, he was named to the All-EuroCup First Team, and selected the EuroCup MVP. McCollum's team, Galatasaray, eventually won the season's EuroCup championship.

Return to China
On August 1, 2016, McCollum signed with the Beikong Fly Dragons of the Chinese Basketball Association (CBA). He led the CBA league in scoring, for the second time.

Return to Turkey
On March 8, 2017, McCollum returned to Turkey for a second stint, signing with Galatasaray for the remainder of the Turkish Super League's 2016–17 season.

On July 14, 2017, McCollum signed with the Turkish club Anadolu Efes, of the European-wide top-tier level, the EuroLeague, for the 2017–18 season. On November 14, 2017, McCollum recorded 31 points, shooting 8-of-11 from 3-point range, along with four rebounds and three assists in a 92–72 win over Maccabi Tel Aviv. He was subsequently named EuroLeague Round 7 MVP. On June 28, 2018, McCollum and Efes officially parted ways.

Russia
On September 21, 2018, McCollum signed with the Russian team Unics Kazan for the 2018–19 season. He averaged 19.9 points per game in the VTB league. On July 19, 2020, McCollum parted ways with the team.

On September 7, 2020, he signed with Khimki of the VTB United League. McCollum averaged 14.1 points per game in VTB league play.

On August 17, 2021, he signed with Lokomotiv Kuban of the VTB United League.

Return to Turkey for third time

On June 22, 2022, he signed with Pınar Karşıyaka of the Basketbol Süper Ligi.

The Basketball Tournament
McCollum has competed with Overseas Elite in The Basketball Tournament (TBT). He was a point guard on the 2015, 2016, 2017 and 2018 teams that all won the championship game of the winner-take-all tournament. In 2017, McCollum averaged 13.7 PPG during the tournament. In TBT 2018, McCollum played six games. He averaged 13.2 PPG, 2.8 assists per game and 2.7 rebounds per game. Overseas Elite reached the championship game and played Eberlein Drive, winning 70–58 for their fourth consecutive TBT title. McCollum was also named to the TBT 2018 All-Tournament Team. McCollum did not play in TBT 2019, due to getting married.

Personal
McCollum's younger brother, CJ McCollum, is a professional basketball player for the New Orleans Pelicans of the NBA.

College awards
All-Mid-Central College Conference Newcomer of the Year: (2006–07)
4× All-Mid-Central College Conference Team: (2006–07, 2007–08, 2008–09, 2009–10)
All-Mid-Central College Conference 2nd Team: (2006–07)
3× All-Mid-Central College Conference 1st Team: (2007–08, 2008–09, 2009–10)
All-Mid-Central College Conference Player of the Year: (2009–10)
4× NAIA Division II All-American: (2006–07, 2007–08, 2008–09, 2009–10)
NAIA Division II All-American First Team: (2009–10)

References

Further reading

External links
Errick McCollum at euroleague.net
Errick McCollum at eurobasket.com
Errick McCollum at esake.gr 
Errick McCollum at tblstat.net

1988 births
Living people
20th-century African-American people
21st-century African-American sportspeople
African-American basketball players
American expatriate basketball people in China
American expatriate basketball people in Greece
American expatriate basketball people in Israel
American expatriate basketball people in Russia
American expatriate basketball people in Turkey
American men's basketball players
Anadolu Efes S.K. players
Apollon Patras B.C. players
Basketball players from Canton, Ohio
BC UNICS players
Beijing Royal Fighters players
Elitzur Maccabi Netanya B.C. players
Galatasaray S.K. (men's basketball) players
Goshen Maple Leafs men's basketball players
Hapoel Kfar Saba B.C. players
Karşıyaka basketball players
Panionios B.C. players
Point guards
PBC Lokomotiv-Kuban players
Shooting guards
Zhejiang Golden Bulls players